is an English land law case concerning the right of a person with an equitable interest in a home to remain in actual occupation, even if a bank has a charge and is seeking repossession.

Facts
Mrs Hodgson bought 31 Gibbs Green, Edgware, Middlesex in 1939. After being widowed in April 1959 she took Mr Evans as a lodger, and in June 1960 transferred him her freehold for free. He told her she should give him the deeds so her nephew, in the foreign service, would not return and turn her out. He also took money to invest on her behalf. He registered himself, and sold it to Mr Marks, who gave a charge to Cheltenham & Gloucester Building Society. Mrs Hodgson, still living there, found out and claimed a declaration that Mr Marks should transfer his freehold to her, free from the building society charge. Mr Evans had held on trust for her, and that bound Mr Marks and the building society.

Judgment

High Court
Ungoed-Thomas J held that Mrs Hodgson did not have the right to stay in her home. He found that Mrs Hodgson had always intended for Mr Evans to hold any title on trust for her, despite any signed writing (Law of Property Act 1925, section 53(1)(b) declaration of trust in land requires writing, but (2) does not affect resulting, implied or constructive trusts). She reposed trust and confidence in him. The key point was that the requirement of writing could not be used to let a fraud be perpetrated. But he held that Mrs Hodgson nevertheless lost because she was not in ‘actual occupation’.

Court of Appeal
Russell LJ found in favour of Mrs Hodgson, but on the basis that there was a resulting trust, rather than that statute should not be used as an instrument of fraud. She had an equitable proprietary interest through a resulting trust, and this interest came before the building society's charge.

See also

English land law

Notes

References

English property case law
1971 in case law
1971 in British law
Court of Appeal (England and Wales) cases